Leonardo de Oliveira Clemente (born April 12, 1989 in Itaperuna, state of Rio de Janeiro), or simply Léo Itaperuna, is a Brazilian striker who plays for FC Cascavel

Career

Club career
Formed in Fluminense, Leo made an immediate impact in Swiss Football after his arrival at Sion, scoring in every friendly game played by his team during the summer preparation.

He was discovered in a small club in the interior of Brazil (Arapongas), seen by media and professionals in Swiss football as: "A strong talented striker, natural finisher." His speed and technique had surprised the football world along with his very strong physical abilities despite his relative small size and undeniable goal scoring skills.

Laurent Fournier, his coach at Sion said of him in an interview: "He's really a refreshing and good surprise for us. Leo have all the kit of the modern perfect striker, he's never short on efforts for the team, fights on every ball, is Lethal on 1 v 1 and despite his short size for a No. 9 (1.73m), he jumps 70cm off the ground. For me, even more important than that in the modern game,  he's humble and always starving for work, the key for any talented player to reach success. If he continues this way he will go very far."

His Representative, Rui Alves was quoted lately in an interview saying about: "Leo progressed in a exponential way in the past year. I've have been bluffed by the way he's adapting to Europe and with his progression all this pasts months. I truly believe that the kid will break through really fast in European football if he continues to be focus and committed like this. Switzerland is being the perfect adaptation championship for Leo. You will heard very highly about him very soon without a doubt, if he keeps with this kind of exigences and standards in his game, he's a very very good young man in and out the pitch what makes everything much more easy for him in all senses".

External links

Léo Itaperuna at BDFA.com.ar 
 
romandie.com 
youtube.com 

1989 births
Living people
Brazilian footballers
Brazilian expatriate footballers
Fluminense FC players
Paulista Futebol Clube players
America Football Club (RJ) players
Clube Recreativo e Atlético Catalano players
Duque de Caxias Futebol Clube players
Associação Desportiva Cabofriense players
FC Sion players
Suwon Samsung Bluewings players
Jiangxi Beidamen F.C. players
FC Aarau players
Itaperuna Esporte Clube players
Anápolis Futebol Clube players
Esporte Clube São Bento players
Vila Nova Futebol Clube players
Paraná Clube players
Sertãozinho Futebol Clube players
Associação Desportiva Itaboraí players
Concórdia Atlético Clube players
Campeonato Brasileiro Série A players
Campeonato Brasileiro Série B players
Campeonato Brasileiro Série D players
Swiss Super League players
Swiss Challenge League players
China League One players
K League 1 players
Association football forwards
Expatriate footballers in Switzerland
Expatriate footballers in South Korea
Expatriate footballers in China
Brazilian expatriate sportspeople in Switzerland
Brazilian expatriate sportspeople in South Korea
Brazilian expatriate sportspeople in China
People from Itaperuna